The Equitable Co-operative Building Association is a historic building, located at 915 F Street, Northwest, Washington, D.C., in the Penn Quarter neighborhood. As of November 2018, it houses the second location of the restaurant Succotash.

History
It was designed by Frederick B. Pyle, and Arthur B. Heaton in the Neoclassical style.
It was the headquarters of the Equitable Co-operative Building Association, of John Joy Edson.

It was added to the National Register of Historic Places in 1994, and is a contributing property to the Downtown Historic District. The 2009 property value of 915 F Street, NW is $3,155,100.
It was owned by Abdul Khanu who operated the Platinum nightclub, Club Bounce.
In 2009, Peter Andrulis III bought it and attempted to operate a Museum of Arts and Sciences.
In 2011, Douglas Development Corp. bought it. In September 2017, Edward Lee opened a second location of Succotash restaurant in it after an extensive interior improvements.

The Architectural drawings are held at the Library of Congress.

References

External links
https://web.archive.org/web/20120423014638/http://data.greatbuildings.com/wiki/Equitable_Co-operative_Building_Association

Office buildings on the National Register of Historic Places in Washington, D.C.
Office buildings completed in 1911
Neoclassical architecture in Washington, D.C.
Historic district contributing properties in Washington, D.C.